The Leistarchini is a tribe of thread-legged bugs.

Partial list of genera
Bagauda Bergroth, 1903
Gomesius Distant, 1903
Guithera
Lutevula
Mafulemesa
Ploiaria
Proguithera

References

Reduviidae
Hemiptera tribes
Taxa named by Edward Payson Van Duzee